The year 1903 in architecture involved some significant architectural events and new buildings.

Events
January 31 – The Sängerhaus in Strasbourg opens with an inaugural concert.
 September – First Garden City Ltd formed to develop Letchworth in England with Barry Parker and Raymond Unwin as architects.
 The Group Plan for the civic center of Cleveland, Ohio, by Daniel Burnham, Arnold Brunner, and John Carrere is released.
 Giles Gilbert Scott wins the competition to design Liverpool Cathedral.

Buildings and structures

Buildings completed

 The Beurs van Berlage (Amsterdam Stock Exchange), designed by Hendrik Berlage.
 Hill House, Helensburgh, Scotland, designed by Charles Rennie Mackintosh.
 St Cyprian's, Clarence Gate, London, designed by Ninian Comper.
 St Ignatius Church, Stamford Hill, London, designed by Benedict Williamson, first portion.
 Juselius Mausoleum, Pori, Finland, designed by Josef Stenbäck.
 Palazzo Castiglioni (Milan), Italy, designed by Giuseppe Sommaruga.
 Wemyss Bay railway station in Scotland, rebuilt by James Miller.
 Communal Palace of Buzău, Romania, designed by Alexandru Săvulescu (died 1902).
 22, Rue du Général de Castelnau in Strasbourg, France, designed by Franz Lütke and Heinrich Backes.
 56, Allée de la Robertsau in Strasbourg, designed by Lütke and Backes.

Awards
 RIBA Royal Gold Medal – Charles Follen McKim.
 Grand Prix de Rome, architecture: Léon Jaussely.

Births
 January 7 – Ioannis Despotopoulos, Greek architect and academic (died 1992)
 March 7 – Raymond McGrath, Australian-born architect, illustrator and interior designer working in the British Isles (died 1977)
 April 18 – Stephen Dykes Bower, English ecclesiastical architect (died 1994)
 June 17 – A. Hays Town, American architect known for commercial and domestic architecture (died 2005)
 July 16 – Adalberto Libera, Italian Modernist architect (died 1963)
 July 18 – Victor Gruen, Austrian-born architect of shopping malls (died 1980)
 August 21 – F. S. Platou, Norwegian architect (died 1980)
 October 18 – Albert Frey, American "desert modernist" architect (died 1998)
 October 24 – Charlotte Perriand, French architect and designer (died 1999)

Deaths
 May 29 – Bruce Price, American architect (born 1845)
 August 28 – Frederick Law Olmsted, American landscape architect, journalist, social critic and public administrator (born 1822)
 November 16 – Camillo Sitte, Austrian architect, painter and city planner (born 1843)
 date unknown – Louis-Daniel Perrier, Swiss architect (born 1818)

References